The 1878 Hereford by-election was fought on 14 March 1878.  The byelection was fought due to the resignation of the incumbent Conservative MP, Evan Pateshall.  It was won by the Conservative candidate George Arbuthnot.

References

1878 in England
Politics of Hereford
1878 elections in the United Kingdom
By-elections to the Parliament of the United Kingdom in Herefordshire constituencies
19th century in Herefordshire